Hestimoides is a genus of beetles in the family Cerambycidae, containing the following species:

 subgenus Hestimoides
 Hestimoides compactus Breuning, 1939
 Hestimoides stellatus (Pascoe, 1867)
 Hestimoides striolatus (Aurivillius, 1921)
 Hestimoides trigeminatus (Pascoe, 1867)
 subgenus Ochrestimoides
 Hestimoides ochreovittatus Breuning, 1950

References

Apomecynini
Cerambycidae genera